Henry Lewis may refer to:

Arts and entertainment 
 Henry Lewis (artist) (1819–1904), British-born American painter and showman
 Henry Clay Lewis (1825–1850), American short story writer and medical doctor
 Henry Jackson Lewis (c. 1857–1891), African-American political cartoonist
 Henry Lewis (musician) (1932–1996), American double-bassist and orchestral conductor
 Henry Lewis (playwright), English playwright in 2015 Laurence Olivier Awards and The Comedy About a Bank Robbery

Military figures 
 Henry Balding Lewis (1889–1966), U.S. Army officer
 Henry Lewis (Medal of Honor) (1844–1930), Medal of Honor recipient

Politicians 
 Henry Gould Lewis (1820–1891), Connecticut politician
 Henry Owen Lewis (1842–1913), Irish Member of Parliament for Carlow Borough, 1874–80

Sports figures 
 Henry Lewis (American football) (active in 1921), American football player
 Henry Lewis (baseball) (fl. 1943), American baseball player
 Henry Lewis (footballer), Sierra Leonean footballer in 2012 Malaysia Premier League

Others 
 Henry Lewis (escaped slave), escaped from William Jarvis, a leading official in Upper Canada
 Henry Carvill Lewis (1853–1888), American geologist and mineralogist
 Henry Lewis (academic) (1889–1968), professor of Welsh
 Henry Lewis (surveyor) (1813–1889), discoverer of Lewis Pass in New Zealand
 Henry Ardern Lewis (1879–1957), Church of England minister and Cornish Bard

See also
 Harry Lewis (disambiguation)
 Hal Lewis (disambiguation)